Darleen Carr (born Darlene Farnon) is an American actress, singer, and voice-over artist. She is also known as Darlene Carr or Darleen Drake. She has two sisters, both actresses (Shannon Farnon and Charmian Carr).

Early years
Carr was born in Chicago, Illinois. Her father, Brian Farnon, was the orchestra leader at Harrah's Lake Tahoe, and her mother, Rita Oehman, performed in The Oehman Twins singing act.

Career
Darleen was the youngest of three sisters, all of whom went into acting.  Older sister Charmain selected the stage name "Charmain Carr"; after very early on using the stage name "Darleen Drake", Darleen adopted the last name Carr as well, using it throughout the rest of her professional career.  

Carr's only television series in which she had a lead billing was the short-lived CBS sitcom Miss Winslow & Son (1979), in which she played Susan Winslow, the single mother and titular character. In 1965–1966, Carr played Kathy, a student at a private girls' academy in California on The John Forsythe Show. She was a regular on the 1969 version of the NBC variety series Dean Martin Presents the Gold Diggers  and played Cindy Smith in the 1971–1972 ABC comedy-drama The Smith Family.

Carr also had recurring roles as Margaret Devlin in the western series The Oregon Trail (1977)  and the editor, reporter and photographer of the town newspaper in the 1981–1982 television series Bret Maverick.

Carr portrayed Kathleen "Kick" Kennedy, John F. Kennedy's favorite sister, in a television movie, Young Joe, the Forgotten Kennedy, and played a lead role in the miniseries Once an Eagle (1976). She portrayed the daughter of Karl Malden's character on 12 episodes of The Streets of San Francisco (1972–77), as well as in the TV movie sequel, Back to the Streets of San Francisco (1992).

On television during the 1970s and 1980s she was a guest on such shows as The F.B.I. (on 2 episodes); The Virginian; Alias Smith and Jones; Marcus Welby, M.D. (2 episodes); Chopper One; The Rookies (3 episodes); The Waltons; S.W.A.T.; Medical Center (3 episodes); Man from Atlantis; Fantasy Island; The Paper Chase; Barnaby Jones (3 episodes); The White Shadow; Vega$; Quincy, M.E.; Charlie's Angels; V; Murder, She Wrote; Magnum, P.I.; Family Affair; and Simon & Simon (4 episodes).  In 1994 she appeared as Ambassador E'Tyshra on Star Trek: Deep Space Nine. She also guest-starred in 1976 in the first episode of the final series of the British TV series Thriller.

Her film roles included appearances in Monkeys, Go Home! (1967) —her film debut, The Impossible Years (1968) with David Niven, Death of a Gunfighter (1969) with Richard Widmark, The Beguiled (1971) with Clint Eastwood, Eight Days a Week (1997) with Keri Russell, and TV horror movies such as The Horror at 37,000 Feet (1973) and the TV remake of Piranha (1995).

She is also a singer and sang in The Sound of Music, dubbing the high singing voice for Duane Chase as Kurt, and several of her sister Charmian's high solo parts. She sang in Walt Disney's The Jungle Book, as The Girl. She was under contract to RCA Records, played  Abigail Adams in 1776 at the Long Beach Civic Light Opera, and she released an album, The Carr-De Belles Band, in 1988, and performed at Vine St Bar and Grill in Hollywood with her band.

Carr was also part of a Members Only Preview for the behind-the-scenes exhibition titled Walt Disney’s The Jungle Book: Making a Masterpiece during a special talk alongside Andreas Deja, Floyd Norman and Bruce Reitherman which took place on June 22, 2022. The exhibition will take place at The Walt Disney Family Museum from June 23, 2022 to January 8, 2023.

She has played Melissa Gardner in the A.R Gurney play "Love Letters" twice. Once at The Grove Theater in 1992 opposite her husband at the time, Jameson Parker, and recently for the BVS Cultural Arts Association's production on October 15, 2022.

Award nominations
In 1977, she was nominated for the Best Supporting Actress Golden Globe for her performance in the miniseries Once an Eagle.

Filmography

References

External links

Living people
20th-century American actresses
Actresses from Chicago
American television actresses
American film actresses
American voice actresses
American child actresses
American women singers
RCA Victor artists
Western (genre) television actors
21st-century American women
Year of birth missing (living people)